Moenkopi is a census-designated place (CDP) in Coconino County, Arizona, United States, adjacent to the southeast side of Tuba City off U.S. Route 160.  The population was 964 at the 2010 census.

A Hopi community, it was founded in 1870 as a summer farming area by people from the Hopi Third Mesa village of Oraibi. It lies in a  exclave of the Hopi Reservation which is separated from the main part of the reservation which lies to the east. Both parts are surrounded by Navajo Nation territory. The smaller section comprises only 3.8 percent of the Hopi Reservation's land area and 13.2 percent (916 persons) of its population.

Geography 
Located in the center of a wide valley, Moenkopi is located at  (36.111741, -111.220699).

Demographics 

As of the census of 2000, there were 901 people, 242 households, and 202 families residing in the CDP. The racial makeup of the CDP was 96.7% Native American, 1.7% from two or more races, 1.4% White, 0.2% from other races, and  Hispanic or Latino of any race were 0.8% of the population.

There were 242 households, out of which 36.8% had children under the age of 18 living with them, 46.7% were married couples living together, 28.9% had a female householder with no husband present, and 16.5% were non-families. 14.0% of all households were made up of individuals, and 5.8% had someone living alone who was 65 years of age or older.  The average household size was 3.72 and the average family size was 4.06.

In the CDP, the age distribution of the population showed 35.2% under the age of 18, 9.4% from 18 to 24, 23.1% from 25 to 44, 20.0% from 45 to 64, and 12.3% who were 65 years of age or older.  The median age was 31 years.  For every 100 females, there were 96.7 males.  For every 100 females age 18 and over, there were 89.0 males.

The median income for a household in the CDP was $38,710, and the median income for a family was $38,266. Males had a median income of $49,063 versus $28,409 for females. The per capita income for the CDP was $11,432.  About 15.6% of families and 13.8% of the population were below the poverty line, including 15.8% of those under the age of 18 and 4.5% of those 65 and older.

Education
Tuba City Unified School District is the local school district. Tuba City High School is the comprehensive high school.

There is a tribal school, Moencopi Day School, in Monekopi that is affiliated with the Bureau of Indian Education (BIE).

References

Census-designated places in Coconino County, Arizona
Hopi Reservation
Populated places established in 1870
1870 establishments in Arizona Territory